The men's large hill team ski jumping competition for the 1998 Winter Olympics was held in Hakuba Ski Jumping Stadium. It occurred on 17 February.

The medals for the competition were presented by Juan Antonio Samaranch, President of the International Olympic Committee, and Shunichiro Okano, IOC Member; Japan, and the medalists' bouquets were presented by Marc Hodler, President of the International Ski Federation; Switzerland, and Yoshiro Ito, Vice-President of International Ski Federation, Japan.

Results

References

Ski jumping at the 1998 Winter Olympics